Morteza Sepahvand (born 7 August 1979) is an Iranian amateur boxer who qualified for the 2008 Olympics at junior welterweight. He was born in Khorramabad.

At the 2006 Asian Games he lost to Olympic Gold medalist Manus Boonjumnong.

At the 2007 World Amateur Boxing Championships he defeated Ionuţ Gheorghe then beat him again at the 2008 Summer Olympics.

External links
World 2007

1979 births
Living people
Light-welterweight boxers
Boxers at the 2008 Summer Olympics
Olympic boxers of Iran
Boxers at the 2006 Asian Games
Boxers at the 2010 Asian Games
Iranian male boxers
People from Khorramabad
Asian Games competitors for Iran
21st-century Iranian people
20th-century Iranian people